Kaudwane is a village in Kweneng District of Botswana. The village is located in Kalahari Desert, around 220 km north-west of Gaborone, and it has a primary school. The population was 551 in 2001 census.

References

Kweneng District
Villages in Botswana